Spartak Guba FK was an Azerbaijani football club based in Quba (city).

History
The club was founded in 1961 under the name of Spartak.

References

Spartak Quba
Spartak Quba
1961 establishments in Azerbaijan
Defunct football clubs in Azerbaijan
2011 disestablishments in Azerbaijan
Association football clubs disestablished in 2011